The Devil-Ship Pirates is a 1964 British pirate adventure film directed by Don Sharp.

The film was the first of several collaborations between Don Sharp and star Christopher Lee.

Plot
A pirate ship, involved in 1588 battles on the side of the Spanish Armada, suffers extensive damage and must put into a village on the British coast for repairs.

The village is small and isolated.  The Spanish convince the villagers that the English fleet has been defeated and that they, the Spanish, are now their masters. This results in the villagers' sullen cooperation, but rumours and unrest begin to spread and soon the Spanish pirates find themselves facing a revolt.

Cast
 Christopher Lee as Captain Robeles
 Andrew Keir as Tom 
 John Cairney as Harry
 Duncan Lamont as The Bosun
 Michael Ripper as Pepe
 Ernest Clark as Sir Basil
 Barry Warren as Manuel 
 Suzan Farmer as Angela
 Natasha Pyne as Jane
 Annette Whiteley as Meg 
 Charles Houston as Antonio
 Philip Latham as Miller
 Harry Locke as Bragg
 Leonard Fenton as Quintana
 Jack Rodney as Mandrake 
 Barry Linehan as Gustavo
 Bruce Beeby as Pedro
 Michael Peake as Grande 
 Johnny Briggs as Pablo
 Michael Newport as Smiler
 Peter Howell as The Vicar
 June Ellis as Mrs. Blake

Production

Development
In the early 1960s Hammer Films were best known for their horror movies, but they also tried other genres. The studio made a swashbuckler, The Pirates of Blood River (1962), written by Jimmy Sangster and starring Christopher Lee; it was a success at the box office, so Hammer commissioned Sangster to write another pirate-themed story for Lee, The Devil Ship Pirates. "The idea 
was to release these bloody-but-not-too- bloody adventure films during school 
holidays, and they made a fortune on them," said Don Sharp, who would direct Devil Ship.

Sharp had just made his first feature for Hammer, Kiss of the Vampire and was invited back to work at the studio by Tony Hinds. Sharp says the film was aimed at the school holiday market so it needed to have a "U" certificate. "But they wanted it to look like a X film. So we had an action film with kids in it," said Sharp.

It was the first time Sharp had worked with Christopher Lee. The director had seen several of Lee's performances "and I was worried about a range I saw as playing down one line. But right from our first meeting we got on and when we talked it was two actors talking. We'd explore his character and I found myself suggesting depths to Captain Roebles that I hadn't expected I'd be able to. Chris is tremendously professional and can essay roles that are charming and threatening at the same time - he has a lovely stillness about him.  He’s a very commanding presence."

Shooting
Filming began on 19 August 1963 at Bray Studios in Berkshire. Sharp did not get along particularly well with producer Anthony Nelson Keys who he called "a general manager type and any idea he had was most obvious. I remember him telling me that he wanted  Christopher Lee's pirate to be clad in blue and I said, ‘A blue pirate. Tony? What shall we call him. Little Boy Blue?’ So he asked me what colour I wanted and I told him grey, which he thought was dull and unthreatening until I reminded him that it was threatening enough for the Nazis!” ".

The outdoor sets were previously utilised for Hammer's The Scarlet Blade, made the previous year. Ripper, Lamont and Farmer appeared in both films.

The opening scene was shot in a flooded gravel pit a couple of miles up the road  from Bray Studios. On the other side of the road council workers were starting to build a motorway so Sharp had the crew lay smoke to obscure trucks in the background. "Outwitting the M4 was a major part of making this movie," joked Sharp later who said making the film was "great fun".

According to Christopher Lee, Hammer Studios had built a full-sized galleon in some sand pits on a steel structure under the water. Although warned not to have too many people on board at once, one day the tea boat was lifted onto a platform level with the water and too many people rushed over to get a cup of tea. The ship capsized, throwing most of the cast and crew in the water. Lee was on the poop deck and luckily managed to hold on to the rail. No one was drowned or seriously hurt. Lee says he"saved the most valuable article possible: the continuity girl's typewriter. The whole structure took several days to right, so that it could be blown up at the end in a glorious holocaust."

"It was lucky we didn't have a serious accident," said Michael Reed, who was the cinematographer. Sharp said, "The scaffolding went to the bottom and was there for two years with the company who owned the pit still charging hire for it!”

Reception

Box Office
Kinematograph Weekly called the film a "money maker" at the British box office for 1964.

Critical
The Guardian called it "very good fun and should have children sitting on the edge of their seats."

The Monthly Film Bulletin called it a "hackneyed, land-locked corsair yarn, quite well mounted but utterly lacklustre."

The Devil-Ship Pirates is a "lacklustre pirate yarn with not much action and some elements of Hammer horror" according to Halliwell's Film and Video Guide. Richard Harland-Smith it is a "spirited romp", but notes that the film's "diet of floggings, hangings and swordplay pushed its 'U' certificate to the limits."

Legacy
Sharp and Lee would go on to make several more films together, including The Face of Fu Manchu, The Brides of Fu Manchu, Rasputin the Mad Monk and Bear Island.

Hammer once announced it would make a biopic of the female pirate Anne Bonney to star Raquel Welch, Mistress of the Seas. However it was never made.

Sharp later recalled that Devil Ship and Kiss of the Vampire "are among the happiest movies I ever worked on. With Shepperton or Pinewood you were one of a number of pictures being made, and if you were on a small budget, you got second or third best. At Bray, when you walked through the gate, everything was on your picture. There was a family feeling about it, and a feeling of pride as 
well: everyone knew their craft and inspired others."

References

Notes

External links
 
 

1964 films
1960s historical adventure films
British historical adventure films
Fictional pirates
Pirate films
Seafaring films
Films set in the 1580s
Films set in Cornwall
Films shot at Bray Studios
Associated British Picture Corporation
Hammer Film Productions films
Films directed by Don Sharp
Films with screenplays by Jimmy Sangster
1960s English-language films
1960s British films